The 1994 World Artistic Gymnastics Championships were held in Brisbane, Australia, from 19–24 April 1994.

Only the all-around and apparatus events were contested at this meet. A team World Championships meet was held in Dortmund, Germany, in November 1994. This was the only year in which the World Championships were split into two separate competitions in this fashion.

Results

Medal table

Overall

Men

Women

Participants

Men

Women

Men's results

All-around

Floor exercise

Pommel horse

Still Rings

Vault

Parallel bars

Horizontal bar

Women's results

All-around

Vault

Uneven bars

Balance beam

Floor exercise 

NB: For this competition, tie-breaker policies were used. When scores were identical, the gymnast with the higher score in the preliminary round was awarded the higher placement in finals.

World Artistic Gymnastics Championships
International gymnastics competitions hosted by Australia
G
G
1994 in gymnastics
1990s in Brisbane
April 1994 sports events in Australia